Jerzy Józef Trela (14 March 1942 – 15 May 2022) was a Polish actor. In 2003 he starred in the film An Ancient Tale: When the Sun Was a God under Jerzy Hoffman. He is also known for White (1994), Quo Vadis (2001) and Ida (2013).

Trela played also many roles on stage at The Old Theatre in Kraków (Polish: Narodowy Stary Teatr im. Heleny Modrzejewskiej w Krakowie) and he was Professor and Rector at the Ludwik Solski Academy for the Dramatic Arts.

Honours and awards
 Meritorious for Polish Culture (1989)
 Commander's Cross with Star of the Order of Polonia Restituta (2011), previously awarded the Commander's Cross (2000) and Knight's Cross (1981)
 Polish Film Awards: Eagles for Best Supporting Actor in Quo Vadis (2002) 
 Gold Medal "Gloria Artis" (2005)

Selected filmography
 The Moth (1980)
 Man of Iron (1981)
 Danton (1983)                                                  
 The Night of the Emerald Moon (1985)
 Magnat (1987)
 The Mother of Kings (1987)
 Dekalog: Nine (1988)
 On the Silver Globe (1988)
 Three Colours: White (1994)
 Pan Tadeusz (1999)
 Quo Vadis (2001)
 An Ancient Tale: When the Sun Was a God (2003)
 Hope (2007)
 Ida (2013) as Szymon Skiba
 A Grain of Truth (2015)

References

External links
 
 Jerzy Trela profile culture.pl; accessed 2 March 2017. 

1942 births
2022 deaths
People from Wadowice County
Polish male film actors
Polish male stage actors
Knights of the Order of Polonia Restituta
Commanders of the Order of Polonia Restituta
Commanders with Star of the Order of Polonia Restituta
Recipients of the Gold Medal for Merit to Culture – Gloria Artis
Recipients of the Decoration of Honor Meritorious for Polish Culture
Male actors from Kraków